Fatalna ljubav (English: Fatal Love) is the seventh studio album by Serbian singer Ceca. It was released in 1995 became the best-selling album of the year in her home country of Serbia. It's Edin Dervišhalidović Ceca former who wrote the lyrics on the album.

Track listing

References

1995 albums
Ceca (singer) albums